Jennifer Pertsch is a Canadian writer, producer, story editor, and one of the founding partners of Fresh TV, a Toronto-based production studio specializing in teen and family oriented television projects. She began her career as a writer for Nelvana Ltd., before moving to Fresh TV. She co-created and executive produced 6teen, Stoked,  Total Drama Island, Total Drama Action, Total Drama World Tour.

Awards
In 2007, 6teen was awarded the Alliance for Children and Television's "Award of Excellence, Animation" for programming for children, ages 9–14. She has received an Emmy Award nomination for her writing on the award-winning series Rolie Polie Olie, and a Gemini Award nomination for best animated program or series for Total Drama Island.

References

External links
 Fresh TV Inc.'s homepage
 

Living people
Year of birth missing (living people)
Canadian television writers
Canadian television producers
Canadian women television producers
Canadian women television writers